The siege of Ma'arra occurred in late 1098 in the city of Ma'arrat al-Numan, in what is modern-day Syria, during the First Crusade. It is infamous for the claims of widespread cannibalism displayed by the Crusaders.

Prologue
After the Crusaders, including Raymond IV of Toulouse and Bohemond of Taranto, successfully led the  Siege of Antioch, they started to raid the surrounding countryside during the winter months. The Crusaders had been ineffective in assessing and protecting their supply lines, which led to widespread hunger and lack of proper equipment within the Crusader armies.

In July 1098, Raymond Pilet d'Alès, a knight in the army of Raymond, led an expedition against Maarat, an important city on the road south towards Damascus. His troops met a much larger Muslim garrison in the town and they were completely routed with many casualties. For the rest of the summer the crusaders continued their march south and captured many other small towns, and arrived again at Maarat in November.

Siege
Around the end of November, thousands of crusaders started to besiege the city. The citizens were at first unconcerned, since Raymond Pilet's expedition had been such a failure, and they taunted the crusaders. The crusaders could also not afford to conduct a lengthy siege, as winter was approaching and they had few supplies, but they were also unable to break through the city's defenses, consisting of a deep ditch and strong walls.

The defenders of the city, mostly an urban militia and inexperienced citizens, managed to hold off the attacks for about two weeks. The crusaders sent repeatedly envoys offering terms of surrender that included security of the Arab population's lives and properties in return of the establishment of a Frankish governor of the city. These terms were rejected. The crusaders spent this time building a siege tower, which allowed them to pour over the walls of the city, while at the same time a group of knights scaled the undefended walls on the other side of the city.

The crusaders occupied the walls on December 11. The Muslims retreated into the city, and both sides prepared to rest for the night, but the poorer crusaders rushed through and plundered Maarat. On the morning of December 12, the garrison negotiated with Bohemond, who promised them safe conduct if they surrendered. The Muslims surrendered, but the crusaders immediately began to massacre the population. Meanwhile, Bohemond seized control of the walls and towers while Raymond of Toulouse took control of the interior of the city, continuing their dispute over who would rule conquered territories. The Crusaders also began destroying Maarat's fortifications, forcing Raymond to finally agree to continue the march south.

Cannibalism
Maarat was not as rich as the crusaders had hoped and they were still short of supplies and food as December progressed. Most of the soldiers and knights preferred to continue the march to Jerusalem, caring little for the political dispute between Bohemond and Raymond, and Raymond tried to buy the support of the other leaders. While the leaders negotiated away from the city, some of the starving crusaders at Maarat resorted to cannibalism, feeding on the dead bodies of Muslims.

A chronicler, Radulph of Caen, wrote in his contemporaneous account Gesta Tancredi: "Some people said that, constrained by the lack of food, they boiled pagan adults in cooking-pots, impaled children on spits and devoured them grilled." These events were also chronicled by Fulcher of Chartres, who wrote:

Albert of Aix remarked that "the Christians did not shrink from eating not only killed Turks or Saracens, but even creeping dogs..." However, the events described by Radulph of Caen have been disputed. The famine and cannibalism are recognised as described by Fulcher of Chartres, but the torture and the killing of Muslim captives for cannibalism by Radulph of Caen are very unlikely since no Arab or Muslim records of the events exist. Had they occurred, they would have probably been recorded. That has been noted by BBC Timewatch series, the episode The Crusades: A Timewatch Guide, which included experts Thomas Asbridge and Muslim Arabic historian Fozia Bora, who state that Radulph of Caen's description does not appear in any contemporary Muslim chronicle.

See also
List of incidents of cannibalism
List of massacres in Syria

References

Further reading
 

 
 

Incidents of cannibalism
Battles of the First Crusade
Battles involving the Seljuk Empire
Ma'arra
Conflicts in 1098
11th century in the Seljuk Empire
1098 in Asia
Massacres in Syria